USA-260, also known as GPS IIF-9, GPS SVN-71 and NAVSTAR 73, is an American Satellite navigation which forms part of the Global Positioning System. It was the ninth of twelve Block IIF satellites to be launched.

Launch
Built by Boeing and launched by United Launch Alliance, USA-260 was launched at 18:36 UTC on 25 March 2015, atop a Delta IV carrier rocket, flight number D370, flying in the Medium+(4,2) configuration. The launch took place from Space Launch Complex 37B at the Cape Canaveral Air Force Station, and placed USA-260 directly into medium Earth orbit.

Orbit
It is used to broadcast the PRN 26 signal, and operates in slot 5 of plane B of the GPS constellation.
 It is currently in service following commissioning on April 20, 2015.

References

Spacecraft launched in 2015
GPS satellites
USA satellites
Spacecraft launched by Delta IV rockets